Francis Louis Halzen (born 23 March 1944 in Tienen, Belgium) is a Belgian particle physicist. He is the Hilldale and Gregory Breit Distinguished Professor at the University of Wisconsin–Madison and Director of its Institute for Elementary Particle Physics. Halzen is the Principal Investigator of the IceCube Neutrino Observatory at the Amundsen–Scott South Pole Station in Antarctica, the world's largest neutrino detector which has been operational since 2010.

Background 

Halzen was born and raised in Belgium. He graduated from the University of Louvain (UCLouvain) with a MSc Physics degree in 1966, a PhD in 1969, then his Agrégé de l'Enseignement Supérieur in 1972. Between 1969–1971 he worked as a scientific associate at CERN. Since 1972 he has been a professor at the University of Wisconsin–Madison and the Principal Investigator on the AMANDA and IceCube projects.

Halzen has been a leading scientist in the development of cosmic ray physics and astroparticle physics since the 1970s. In addition to particle physics he published many early papers on cosmic ray anomalies and quark matter, and on relations between particle physics and cosmic rays, on particles from supernovae and on muon production in atmospheric gamma-ray showers. He has served on various advisory committees, including those for the SNO, Telescope Array and Auger-upgrade experiments, the Max Planck Institutes in Heidelberg and Munich, the ICRR at the University of Tokyo, the US Particle Physics Prioritization Panel and the ApPEC particle astrophysics advisory panel in Europe.

With Alan Martin he is the co-author of Quarks and Leptons, a standard text.

AMANDA 

Halzen first learned about attempts by Russian scientists to detect neutrinos in Antarctica, using radio antennas at their Antarctic research station to search for electric sparks resulting from cosmic neutrinos colliding with the ice. After determining these interactions would be too weak to register, in 1987 he started working on the AMANDA project, which proposed burying an array of light sensors deep in the Antarctic ice which is clear, dark, stable, sterile and free of background light. This pilot experiment proved successful, however their results were marred by interference from cosmic rays as well as air bubbles in the ice. This convinced him that a much larger and deeper array would be needed, and in 2005 the AMANDA project became part of its successor project, the IceCube Neutrino Observatory.

IceCube 

Halzen argued for a much larger detector, and was able to secure funding from both European and American sources. In 2005 his team started construction of the IceCube project, designed to be 100 times bigger than AMANDA, with a total size of 1 km3 and buried up to a mile and a half deep. After six years of construction, IceCube became operational in 2010.

The most important result from the IceCube was the clear break-through observation of high-energy neutrinos (about 100 times more energetic than the particles accelerated today in the world’s most powerful machine, the LHC at CERN) in 2013, from as yet not identified sources outside the Galaxy. This discovery has stimulated the planning and development of even larger neutrino telescopes, both at the South Pole and deep under the ocean.

Awards 

 1994: Fellow of the American Physical Society
 2013: Breakthrough of the Year Award by the journal Physics World for the first-time discovery of cosmic neutrinos beyond the Milky Way
 2015: Balzan Prize
 2015: European Physical Society Prize for Astroparticle Physics and Cosmology
 2018: Bruno Pontecorvo Prize for significant contribution to the IceCube detector construction and experimental discovery of high-energy astrophysical neutrinos.

References

Living people
1944 births
People from Tienen
Université catholique de Louvain alumni
People associated with CERN
University of Wisconsin–Madison faculty
Belgian expatriates in the United States
Belgian physicists
Particle physicists
Fellows of the American Physical Society